Vadim Gushchin (born 1963) is a Russian art-photographer.

Biography
Gushchin was born in Novosibirsk in 1963. He is known primarily for his work, made in the genre of post-conceptual still life. In 1986, he graduated at the Moscow Energy Institute. He has been creating artistic photography since 1988. He lives and works in Moscow.

Books and catalogues (selected)
 A la recherche du pere, Paris, 1994.
 Aufbruch. Die neue russische Fotografie, Kоеln, 1998.
 Wadim Gutschtschin Meine Dinge, Braunschweig, 1999.
 IDEA Photographic: After Modernism, Santa Fe, 2002.
 Valery Stigneev Century of Photography, 1894-1994, Moscow, 2005.
 Photoestafeta. From Rodchenko to our days, Moscow, 2006.
 Odense Foto Triennale 2006, Odense, Denmark, 2006.
 FotoFest 2006, Houston, TX, 2006.
 Monography Photographs. Vadim Gushchin, Moscow, Publish House Artist and Book, 2008.
 Doors open day Russian art 1989-2009, Moscow Museum of Modern Art, Moscow.
 Contemporary Russian Photography. FotoFest 2012, Houston, TX, 2012.
 Monography Everyday Objects/Cultural Treasures, Schilt Publishing, Amsterdam, 2013.
 Staging Encounters, Lianzhou Fotofestival, 2014.
 Potovisa. Language of Memory, The 7th International Festival of Photography in the Krasnodar Region

Exhibitions

Solo exhibitions
He has participated in art in exhibitions since 1991 and his first solo exhibition was held in 1995. He has more than 30 solo exhibitions including:
 Meine Dinge, Museum fuer Fotografie, Brunswick, Germany, 1999.
 Exhibition in ROSIZO Gallery, Moscow, 1999.
 Personalismus des Dinges, Kultur Bahnhof Eller, Duesseldorf, Germany.
 Bread and Wood, International Photo-Biennial FotoFest, Houston, US, 2006.
 Breаd, Johannes Larsen Museum, Odense, Denmark, 2006.
 Exhibition in Museum of the History of Photography, Sankt-Petersburg, 2009.
 Aestetik der Statik Alexander Grinberg/Vadim Gushchin in Viktor Grray Gallery, Duesseldorf, 2010.
 Inventory of a Private Library, Blue Sky Gallery, Oregon Center for Photographic Arts, Portland, Oregon, US, 2013.
 Object. Function. Image., Lumière Brothers Photography Сenter, Moscow, 2013.
 Vadim Gushchin. Passed, Month of Photography, Bratislava, Slovakia, 2013.
 Cultural Treasures, International Photo-Festival Lianzhou Foto 2014, Lianzhou, China, 2014.
 Subject Interpretation, 7th International Photofestival PhotoVisa, Krasnodar, Russia. 2015
 Inventory of the Private Library, Lumière Brothers Photography Сenter, Moscow, 2018-2019.http://photography-now.com/exhibition/136126
 Exhibition in the PDNB Gallery, Dallas, Texas, USA, 2019. https://www.facebook.com/PDNBGallery/posts/10156846827722858?comment_id=10156854689087858

Group exhibitions
He has also participated in more than 50 group exhibitions in galleries and museums in Russia and abroad. His works have been presented in the international and Russian сonceptual group projects, such as:
 A la recherche du pere, 1993—94, Paris, France.
 Neue Fotokunst aus Russland, 1994—95, tour of five German cities.
 Aufbruch. Neue russische Fotografie, 1998, Leverkusen, Germany.
 IDEA Photographic: After Modernism, 2002, Santa Fe, US.
 Odense Photo Triennial, Denmark, 2006.
 In Box of Dreams, (Contemporary Russian Photography), International Photography Festival, Pingyao, China, 2009.
 Doors open day Russian art 1989-2009, Moscow Museum of Modern Art, Moscow, 2009.
 Leben elementar, Trier, Germany, 2010.
 Contemporary Russian Photography, Biennial FotoFest, Houston, US, 2012.
 Museum, look of Photographer, The Pushkin State Museum of Fine Arts, Moscow, 2012.
 Contemporary Russian Photography: From Mystery to Poetry and Back, 5th Seoul Photo 2013, Seoul, Korea, 2013.
 Tarantel 2, Kuenstlerhaus Bethanien, Berlin, Germany, 2013.
 Dinner is Served. The Russian Museum Culinary Companion. The Russian Museum, Sankt-Petersburg. 2013 – 2014.
 “.” (New Russian Avangarde. Art as Bridge between East and West.) Kellermann Gallery, Duessldorf, Germany. 2015
 “Soviet Photo”, Lumiere Brothers Centre for Photography, Moscow. 2015
 “Russian House”, Schilt Publishing Gallery, Amsterdam, Holland. 2015
 New Acquisitions. 1998-2014, The Russian Museum, St. Petersburg.
 After Glamour. An artistic analysis of current developments in Russian society. KIT, Düsseldorf, Germany. 2016.http://www.verymagazine.org/very-issue-19/199-overview-issue19/794-after-glamour-moscow-style
 Artist as Hero. International Photography Festival, Pingyao. China. 2018.
 Stillife in Photography, The State Russian Museum, St. Petersburg, Russia. 2018. http://www.rusmuseum.ru/stroganov-palace/exhibitions/still-life-in-photography/#rmPhoto[gallery7972]/1/

Award
2007 - The Silver Camera- Award, received 1st place for best report on Moscow in the category of Architecture Moscow

Collections
Gushchin's work is held in the following permanent public collections:
 The Pushkin State Museum of Fine Arts, Moscow.
 The Russian Museum, St. Petersburg
 Museum of Modern Art, Moscow.
 Museum House of Photography, Moscow.
 National Centre of Contemporary Art, Moscow.
 Museum of Moscow, Moscow.
 Museum of Photographic Collections, Moscow.
 Lumiere Brotherth Photography Center, Moscow.
 State Russian Museum of Photography, Nishny Novgorod, Russia.
 Collection of Photograph's Union, Moscow.
 Surgut's Museum of Fine Arts, Surgut, Russia.
 Museum of Fine Art, Santa Fe, New Mexico, US.
 Museum of Fine Art, Houston, Texas, US.
 Santa Barbara Museum of Art, Santa Barbara, California, US.
 Museum Albertina, Vienna, Austria.
 Museum fuer Photographie, Braunschweig, Germany.
 Museet for Fotokunst, Odense, Denmark.
 Museu de Arte Moderna, Rio de Janeiro, Brazil.
 Boghossian Foundation, Brussels, Belgium.
 Spallart Collection, Salzburg, Austria. https://www.sammlung-spallart.at/en/

Private collections in Russia, Germany, France, Italy, Great Britain, the US, South Korea, and Belgium.

Video about artist and artist's interview
 Interview in the Bleek-Magazine, October 2014
 Vadim Gushchin: still-life, made in November 2011 to the opening of Vadim Gushchin's exhibition Kultural treasures in the Gallery Glaz, Moscow.

References

External links

Artist's YouTube-chanel. https://www.youtube.com/channel/UCF5T9lPnrxnl57QvDorL_tw/
Vicky Goldberg in Aperture-Blog, 2014
 Internet-Exhibition on the Lens Culture 2014
 Webpage of the artist on the Art Photo Index, 2015 
 Michael Weinstein, Review: Vadim Gushchin/Jennifer Norback Fine Art
 Webpage of the artist Marina Bondarenko, Investment in the Russian conceptual photography
 Webpage of the artist Artsland
 Vadim Gushchin Turns Household Items Into Art by Christopher Brennan. The Moscow Times 13 September 2013 | Issue 5212

1963 births
Russian photographers
Soviet photographers
Living people
Post-conceptual artists
Conceptual photographers
Fine art photographers